Kenneth Comninos Michael,  (born 12 April 1938) is an Australian civil engineer, academic and former public servant who was the 30th Governor of Western Australia, serving from 2006 to 2011.

Early life and career
Michael was born in Perth, Western Australia, the son of immigrants from the island of Kastellorizo in Greece.

Michael studied at Imperial College London and was a former Commissioner of Main Roads WA, a chairman of the East Perth Redevelopment Authority, a member of the Economic Regulation Authority, and was the Chancellor of the University of Western Australia.

Michael was appointed a Member of the Order of Australia in 1996, and elevated as a Companion of the Order of Australia in 2006. He was named Western Australian Citizen of the Year in 2001 and received the Centenary Medal in 2003 for "service to the public, engineering and the Greek Community".

Governor of Western Australia
Michael's vice-regal appointment was announced on 6 June 2005 by the then Premier Geoff Gallop, and he was sworn in at Government House, Perth on 18 January 2006 by the Premier Alan Carpenter and also witnessed by Chief Justice of the Supreme Court of Western Australia and Lieutenant-Governor, David Malcolm.

In 2006 Michael was named the patron of the Fremantle Football Club, following in the footsteps of Lieutenant-General Sanderson who was also patron at Fremantle. He has been a member of the club since 1994 as an inaugural Quay Club member. Michael is also the state patron of The Boys' Brigade.

Michael resigned as governor on 2 May 2011. Lieutenant-Governor Wayne Martin became Administrator of Western Australia until Malcolm McCusker was sworn in as governor on 1 July 2011.

Michael was appointed Chairman of the Western Australian Cricket Association in December 2016.

References

1938 births
Alumni of Imperial College London
Australian people of Greek descent
Australian public servants
Companions of the Order of Australia
Governors of Western Australia
Living people
People educated at Perth Modern School
People from Perth, Western Australia
Recipients of the Centenary Medal
University of Western Australia alumni
University of Western Australia chancellors
Fellows of the Australian Academy of Technological Sciences and Engineering